"O Saathi" is a song from the 2018 Bollywood film Baaghi 2. The song is sung by Atif Aslam and composed and written by Arko Pravo Mukherjee.

Release 
The music video was released on 9 March 2018 by T-Series on YouTube. It has received over 250 million views on YouTube as of October 2022. Lyrical video has received over 470 million views as of October 2022.

Music video 
The song's music video features Tiger Shroff and Disha Patani. Set in a college, it shows Tiger pursuing the very shy Disha in every possible way. Whenever she sees him, she stops her work, showing how they fall in love.

Credits and personnel 
 Song – O Saathi
 Singer – Atif Aslam
 Music & Lyrics – Arko
 Additional Vocals – Payal Dev
 Programming & Arrangement – Aditya Dev
 Guitars – Krishna Pradhan
 Flutes – Tejas Vinchurkar
 Musicians Recorded by – Rahul Sharma at AMV Studios
 Vocals recorded at Siena Studios 
 Dubai Mix – Aditya Dev 
 Master – Eric Pillai 
 Label: T-Series

Note: Atif Aslam's name was removed from the credits of the song due to ban on Pakistani artists.

Accolades

References

External links

Atif Aslam songs
Hindi songs
2018 songs
Indian songs
Songs written for films
Songs written by Arko Pravo Mukherjee